Galden Jampaling Monastery is a Buddhist monastery in Chamdo, Tibet, China. Each year on 16 March the temple celebrates The Butter Sculpture Festival with the spectacular "Guqing" God Dance

References

Bibliography
 Buckley, Michael and Straus, Robert (1986): Tibet: a travel survival kit, Lonely Planet Publications. South Yarra, Victoria, Australia. .
 Gruschke, Andreas (2004): Chamdo town in: The Cultural Monuments of Tibet’s Outer Provinces: Kham - vol. 1. The TAR part of Kham,  White Lotus Press, Bangkok 2004, pp. 36–45. 
 Mayhew, Bradley and Kohn, Michael. (2005). Tibet. 6th Edition. Lonely Planet. 

Buddhist monasteries in Tibet
Buddhist temples in Chamdo
Gelug monasteries and temples
Karub District